The 2013–14 Texas A&M–Corpus Christi Islanders women's basketball team represented Texas A&M University–Corpus Christi in the 2013–14 NCAA Division I women's basketball season. This was head coach Royce Chadwick's second season at Texas A&M–Corpus Christi. The Islanders are members of the Southland Conference and played their home games at the American Bank Center and the Dugan Wellness Center.

Media
Video streaming of all non-televised home games and audio for all road games was available at GoIslanders.com.

Roster

Schedule and results

|-
!colspan=9 style="background:#0067C5; color:#9EA2A4;"| Exhibition

|-
!colspan=9 style="background:#007F3E; color:#9EA2A4;"| Regular Season

|-
!colspan=9 style="background:#0067C5; color:#9EA2A4;"| 2014 Southland Conference women's basketball tournament

See also
2013–14 Texas A&M–Corpus Christi Islanders men's basketball team

References

Texas A&M–Corpus Christi Islanders women's basketball seasons
Texas AandM-Corpus Christi
Texas AandM-Corpus Christi Islanders basketball
Texas AandM-Corpus Christi Islanders basketball